The History of Lower Normandy concerns that part of Normandy termed  Lower Normandy (in French Basse-Normandie) which was created as a new region of France in 1956, when the traditional province of Normandy, with an integral history reaching back to the 10th century, was divided into Lower and Upper Normandy. The region comprises three départements, Calvados, Manche and Orne.

Early history
Gallia Lugdunensis
Neustria

17th century
Battle of La Hougue

World War II

The main thrust of Operation Overlord was concentrated on Lower Normandy.

See also
English Channel
History of Normandy
Lower Normandy

Lower Normandy